Miss Franche-Comté is a French beauty pageant which selects a representative for the Miss France national competition from the region of Franche-Comté. Women representing the region under various different titles have competed at Miss France since 1926, although the Miss Franche-Comté title was not used regularly until 1974.

The current Miss Franche-Comté is Marion Navarro, who was crowned Miss Franche-Comté 2022 on 11 September 2022. Two women from Franche-Comté have been crowned Miss France:
Roberte Cusey, who was crowned Miss France 1927, competing as Miss Jura
Patricia Barzyk, who was crowned Miss France 1980, competing as Miss Jura, following the resignation of the original winner

Results summary
Miss France: Roberte Cusey (1926; Miss Jura)
1st Runner-Up: Marina Crouet (1961); Dominique Pasquier (1969; Miss Jura); Patricia Barzyk (1979; Miss Jura; later Miss France); Martine Phillips (1981) 
2nd Runner-Up: Marlène Mourreau (1985); Élodie Couffin (2002); Lauralyne Demesmay (2018); Marion Navarro (2022)
3rd Runner-Up: Brigitte Vuillemin (1969); Ghislaine Bochard (1970; Miss Jura); Pascale Meotti (1988)
5th Runner-Up: Rolande Maroc (1980)
Top 12/Top 15: Astrid Guillemin (1987); Karine Paulin (1990); Caroline Sery (2004); Camille Duban (2013)

Titleholders

Miss Besançon
In 1970, the city of Besançon competed separately under the title Miss Besançon.

Miss Jura
In 1926, 1969, 1991, and several years in the 1970s, the department of Jura competed separately under the title Miss Jura.

Miss Territoire de Belfort
For several years in the 1970s, 1980s, and 1990s, the department of Territoire de Belfort competed separately under the title Miss Territoire de Belfort.

Notes

References

External links

Miss France regional pageants
Beauty pageants in France
Women in France